The first season of the television comedy series Boy Meets World aired between September 24, 1993 and May 13, 1994, on ABC in the United States. The season was produced by Michael Jacobs Productions and Touchstone Television with series creator Michael Jacobs as executive producer. It was broadcast as part of the ABC comedy block TGIF on Friday evenings. The pilot debuted to ratings of 16.5 million viewers.

Cast

Main 

Ben Savage as Cory Matthews
William Daniels as George Feeny 
Betsy Randle as Amy Matthews
Will Friedle as Eric Matthews
Rider Strong as Shawn Hunter
Lee Norris as Stuart Minkus
Lily Nicksay as Morgan Matthews
William Russ as Alan Matthews

Recurring 

Danielle Fishel as Topanga Lawrence

Episodes

References

External links
 

1993 American television seasons
1994 American television seasons
1